Vicari is a comune (municipality) in the Metropolitan City of Palermo in the Italian region Sicily, located about  southeast of Palermo.

Vicari borders the following municipalities: Caccamo, Campofelice di Fitalia, Ciminna, Lercara Friddi, Prizzi, Roccapalumba.

Demographic evolution

References

Municipalities of the Metropolitan City of Palermo